Jay Harris may refer to:

 Jay Harris (footballer, born 1987), English footballer
 Jay Harris (sportscaster) (born 1965), American journalist
 Jay Harris (boxer) (born 1990),  Welsh professional boxer
 Jay M. Harris, American scholar and Harry Austryn Wolfson Professor of Jewish Studies at Harvard University.
 Jay T. Harris (born 1948), African-American journalist
 Jay Kennedy Harris (born 1995), Australian rules footballer

See also
Jason Harris (disambiguation)